The West Palm Beach Street Circuit was a temporary street circuit located in West Palm Beach, Florida, which hosted IMSA GT Championship races between 1986 and 1991.

Lap records

The fastest official race lap records at the West Palm Beach Street Circuit are listed as:

References

Defunct motorsport venues in the United States
Motorsport venues in Florida
IMSA GT Championship circuits